The United Kingdom Special Forces (UKSF) is a directorate comprising the Special Air Service, the Special Boat Service, the Special Reconnaissance Regiment, the Special Forces Support Group, 18 (UKSF) Signal Regiment and the Joint Special Forces Aviation Wing, as well as the supporting No. 47 Squadron. In British freedom of information law, "special forces" has been defined as "those units of the armed forces of the Crown and the maintenance of whose capabilities is the responsibility of the Director of Special Forces or which are for the time being subject to the operational command of that Director". The Royal Marine Commandos and the Ranger Regiment (United Kingdom) are special operations–capable forces, however they do not form part of the UKSF.<ref name="BusinessInsider"

The government and Ministry of Defence (MOD) have a policy of not commenting on the UKSF, in contrast to other countries including the United States, Canada and Australia. In 1996, the UKSF introduced a requirement that serving members sign a confidentiality contract preventing them from disclosing information for life, without the prior approval of the MOD, following the publication of several books written by ex-service members.

Formation
In 1987, the post of Director SAS became Director Special Forces. From that time, the director has had control of both the Army's Special Air Service and the Navy's Special Boat Squadron, which was renamed the Special Boat Service during the formation. The directorate has since been expanded by the creation of the Joint Special Forces Aviation Wing, the Special Reconnaissance Regiment, 18 (UKSF) Signal Regiment and the Special Forces Support Group.

In 2015, the Royal Marines reported that approximately 40% of all UK Special Forces personnel are recruited from the Royal Marines.

On 1 September 2014, the two Army Reserve SAS regiments, the 21 (Artists) Special Air Service Regiment (Reserve) and the 23 Special Air Service Regiment (Reserve) were removed from the UKSF and placed in 1st Intelligence, Surveillance and Reconnaissance Brigade (1 ISR Bde) under the command of Force Troops Command. Their role as part of 1 ISR Bde was to conduct Human, Environment, Reconnaissance and Analysis (HERA) patrols. By April 2019, the two reserve regiments had returned to the UKSF.

Component units
The following units are part of UK Special Forces and UK Special Forces (Reserve).

Royal Navy 

Special Boat Service
C Squadron
M Squadron
X Squadron
Z Squadron
Special Boat Service (Reserve)

British Army 

22 Special Air Service Regiment (22 SAS)
A Squadron
B Squadron
D Squadron
G Squadron
L Detachment (SAS Reserve)
21 Special Air Service Regiment (21 SAS)
A Squadron 
C Squadron
E Squadron
23 Special Air Service Regiment (23 SAS)
B Squadron 
D Squadron 
G Squadron 
Special Reconnaissance Regiment

Royal Air Force 

Special Forces Flight, 47 Squadron

Joint service units 

Special Forces Support Group
 A Company
 B Company
 C Company
 D Company
 F Company
 G Company
Support Company
18 (UKSF) Signal Regiment
SBS Signal Squadron
264 (SAS) Signal Squadron
267 (SRR) Signal Squadron
268 (SFSG) Signal Squadron
63 (SAS) Signal Squadron (Reserve)

Joint Special Forces Aviation Wing 
No. 7 Squadron (Royal Air Force)
No. 658 Squadron (Army Air Corps, British Army)

Special operations–capable forces
The Armed Forces have raised special operations–capable forces that will conduct special operations to train, advise and accompany UK partner countries' forces in high threat environments. The special operations–capable forces will not form part of the UKSF.

The Army formed the Ranger Regiment on 1 December 2021 within a new brigade, the Army Special Operations Brigade, established on 31 August 2021, that will take on some tasks traditionally done by special forces and work with partner forces. The Ranger Regiment's battalions are to be restructured by April 2023. The Chief of the Defence Staff has said that the Ranger Regiment will be similar to the United States Army Special Forces, known as the "Green Berets". Two of the four Ranger Regiment battalions will be deployed to Africa, the third will focus on Eastern Europe and the fourth will be deployed to the Middle East. 

The Royal Navy is transforming the Royal Marines through the Future Commando Force concept, changing its role of amphibious infantry held at readiness to a versatile special operations–capable force. The Marines will often be permanently deployed in two new Littoral Response Groups, with one in Northern Europe and the other in the Indian Ocean.

See also
 List of military special forces units
 United Kingdom Special Forces Selection

References

External links

 Official UKSF (Reserve) website

 
1987 establishments in the United Kingdom
Military units and formations established in 1987
Organisations based in Hertfordshire